Di-(2-ethylhexyl)phosphoric acid (DEHPA or HDEHP) is an organophosphorus compound with the formula (C8H17O)2PO2H.  The colorless liquid is a diester of phosphoric acid and 2-ethylhexanol.  It is used in the solvent extraction of uranium, as well as the rare-earth metals.

Preparation
DEHPA is prepared through the reaction of phosphorus pentoxide and 2-ethylhexanol:
4 C8H17OH  +  P4O10  →  2 [(C8H17O)PO(OH)]2O
[(C8H17O)PO(OH)]2O  +  C8H17OH → (C8H17O)2PO(OH)  +  (C8H17O)PO(OH)2

These reaction produce a mixture of mono-, di-, and trisubstituted phosphates, from which DEHPA can be isolated based on solubility.

Use in uranium extraction

Extraction
DEHPA is used in the solvent extraction of uranium salts from solutions containing the sulfate, chloride, or perchlorate anions.  This extraction is known as the “Dapex procedure.”  Reminiscent of the behaviors of carboxylic acids, DEHPA generally exists as a hydrogen-bonded dimer in the non-polar organic solvents.  For practical applications, the solvent, often called a diluent, is typically kerosene.  A complex is formed from two equivalents of the conjugate base of DEHPA and one uranyl ion. Complexes of the formula (UO2)2[(O2P(OR)2]4 also form, and at high concentrations of uranium, polymeric complexes may form.

The extractability of Fe3+ is similar to that of uranium, so it must be reduced to Fe2+ before the extraction.

Stripping
The uranium is then stripped from the DEHPA/kerosene solution with hydrochloric acid, hydrofluoric acid, or carbonate solutions.  Sodium carbonate solutions effectively strip uranium from the organic layer, but the sodium salt of DEHPA is somewhat soluble in water, which can lead to loss of the extractant.

Synergistic effects
The extractive capabilities of DEHPA can be increased through synergistic effects by the addition of other organophosphorus compounds.  Tributyl phosphate is often used, as well as dibutyl-, diamyl-, and dihexylphosphonates.  The synergistic effects are thought to occur by the addition of the trialkylphosphate to the uranyl-DEHPA complex by hydrogen bonding.  The synergistic additive may also react with the DEHPA, competing with the uranyl extraction, resulting in a decrease in extraction efficiency past a concentration specific to the compound.

Alternatives to DEHPA
Secondary, tertiary, and quaternary amines have also been used for some uranium extractions as an alternative to DEHPA.  Compared to phosphate extractants, amines are more selective for uranium, extract the uranium faster, and are easily stripped with a wider variety of reagents.  However, the phosphates are more tolerant of solids in the feed solution and show faster phase separation.

References

Separation processes
Organophosphates